Daniel Hyde (born 1980) is a choral conductor and organist. In September 2019 he succeeded Sir Stephen Cleobury as Director of Music of the Choir of King's College, Cambridge, having previously served as organist and Director of Music at Saint Thomas Church in New York.

Early career
Hyde began his career in the choir of Durham Cathedral, attending the Chorister School from age 7. When his voice broke a year before he was due to leave the choir, his attention turned to the organ. He became a Fellow of the Royal College of Organists aged 17 whilst a boy at Oakham School, and was later an organ scholar at Durham Cathedral during a gap year.

After Durham, he spent a year as assistant organist at St George's Cathedral in Perth, Western Australia, from 1998–1999. He was awarded an organ scholarship at King's College, Cambridge, which he commenced in 2000.

Upon graduation from King's College, Cambridge, he served as the Director of Music at Jesus College, Cambridge. From 2009 to 2016 he held the position of Informator Choristarum, Organist and Tutorial Fellow in Music at Magdalen College, Oxford, where he was the University Lecturer in the Faculty of Music.

References

English choral conductors
British male conductors (music)
English classical organists
British male organists
Living people
Alumni of King's College, Cambridge
People educated at the Chorister School, Durham
21st-century British conductors (music)
21st-century organists
21st-century British male musicians
Organ Scholars of King's College, Cambridge
1980 births
Male classical organists